Al-Aflaj Governorate is one of the 22 governorates of Riyadh Province, Saudi Arabia, and its base is Layla city. Al-Aflaj is located more than 300 km away from the capital Riyadh, it has a number of agricultural villages on the mountain of Tuwayq (formerly Al-Arida mountain) from its eastern foot to the western edge.

Location 
Al-Aflaj is located in Riyadh region with an area of 54,120 square km, a road passes through it that connects Riyadh (Saudi Arabia Capital) to 'Asir region in the south and the base of Al-Aflaj (Layla city) 300 km away from Riyadh. In the north, there is Hotat Bani Tamim, Al-H̨arīq in the northwest, Al-Kharj in the northeast, Al-Quwaia in the west, As Sulayyil in the south and the eastern area in the east. It's located between 45.20 degree and 23.15 north of the equator, and between the Longitude 45.15 degree and 48.12 Latitude east of Greenwich.

Administrative Divisions

Villages 

 Al-Badie north
 Al-Badie south
 Al-Hadar
 Al-Ahmar
 Wassit
 Al-Ghayl
 Setara
 Harada
 Sayh
 Al-Fuwaydilah
 Al-Amar
 Al-Kharfa
 Al-Rawdah
 Al-Saghw
 Al-Niyabah
 Suwaydan
 Al-Raziqia
 Marwan
 Al-Ajaliya
 Al-Amar
 Al-Juwayfa

References 

Populated places in Riyadh Province